Squash is among the sports contested at the 2022 Commonwealth Games, to be held in Birmingham, England. This will be the seventh staging of squash at the Commonwealth Games since its debut in 1998, and the second staging within England specifically.

The competition is scheduled to take place between 29 July and 8 August 2022.

Schedule
The competition schedule is as follows:

Venue
The competition will be held at the University of Birmingham Hockey and Squash Centre, where the hockey tournaments will also take place.

Medal summary

Medal table

Medalists

Participating nations
There were 28 participating Commonwealth Games Associations (CGA's) in squash with a total of 111 (64 men and 47 women) athletes. The number of athletes a nation entered is in parentheses beside the name of the country.

References

External links
Official website: 2022 Commonwealth Games – Squash

 
2022
2022 Commonwealth Games events
2022 in squash
Squash tournaments in the United Kingdom